The Chicago Storm was an indoor soccer team in the Major Indoor Soccer League from 2004 to 2008 and the Xtreme Soccer League in 2009. The team folded after playing in a local indoor league, the Ultimate Soccer League.

History
The Storm played home games during its first two seasons at the UIC Pavilion on the West Side of Chicago. Former Chicago Sting and Chicago Fire soccer great Frank Klopas coached the team during its first two seasons, and Ted Chronopoulos captained the team for their inaugural 2004 season. Chicago Sting leading scorer Karl-Heinz Granitza worked for the club's front office in 2005. In 2005–06, the Storm started the season with a 2–6 record but improved over the second half of the season to make the play-offs.

With attendance an issue, the team moved its home games to the newly built Sears Centre in Hoffman Estates, a northwest suburb of Chicago, for the 2006–07 season. Steve Morris, a former Illinois soccer player of the year, replaced Klopas as coach for the 2006–07 season.

The Storm had a developmental team in 2008 called the Tormenta. They made the playoffs that year despite a late season slide, but lost to Monterrey in the quarterfinals after losing on a golden goal.

After the MISL folded, the Storm played in the Xtreme Soccer League. After the XSL folded with just one year of play, the Storm joined the Ultimate Soccer League.

Year-by-year

Final squad

Head coaches
  Frank Klopas 2004-2006
  Steve Morris 2006-2009
  Branko Savic 2009–2011

Retired numbers
 No. 12  Karl-Heinz Granitza

Arenas
 UIC Pavilion 2004–2006
 Sears Centre 2006–2009
 Chicago Sports Zone 2009–2010

References

External links
 Official site

 
Xtreme Soccer League teams
Association football clubs established in 2004
S
Soccer clubs in Illinois
Indoor soccer clubs in the United States
Defunct indoor soccer clubs in the United States
Major Indoor Soccer League (2001–2008) teams
2004 establishments in Illinois
2010 disestablishments in Illinois
Association football clubs disestablished in 2010